Nardoni is an Italian surname. Notable people with the surname include:

 Isabella Nardoni (2002–2008), Brazilian girl killed by her father and stepmother
 Juan Ignacio Nardoni
 Mauro Nardoni (born 1945), Italian footballer

See also
 Nardi (surname)

Italian-language surnames